General elections were held in Thailand on 22 March 1992, the first after the National Peace Keeping Council overthrew the elected government of Chatichai Choonhavan in a coup on 23 February 1991. A total of 15 parties and 2,185 candidates contested the 360 seats. The result was a victory for the Justice Unity Party, which won 79 seats, despite receiving fewer votes than the New Aspiration Party. Voter turnout was 59.2%.

Establishment of the Justice Unity Party 
Justice Unity Party It is a political party that brings together politicians from many parties and there are people close to the National Peace Keeping Council was Squadron Leader Thiti Nakornthap, was the party secretary general. The Justice Unity Party leader is Narong Wongwan, former of the Ruam Thai Party leader and former of the Solidarity Party leader.

Election Results

This election, especially in the Bangkok area, the Palang Dharma Party was very successful by being able to get 32 seats of 35 seats, many famous politicians were not elected, such as Police Captain Chalerm Yubamrung, the Mass Party leader. (currently affiliated with the Pheu Thai Party), Marut Bunnag, Pramote Sukhum, Pichai Rattakul, Charoen Kanthawong from the Democrat Party. And it was considered the first political role of a new politician who later became an important player in politics, namely Abhisit Vejjajiva, later the former party leader and former the 27th prime minister, who was a member of the only MP from the Democrat Party in Bangkok and Khunying Sudarat Keyuraphan from the Palang Dharma Party is now the Thai Sang Thai Party leader.

Establishment of the Government 
In the first tier, the Justice Unity Party successfully supported Dr. Arthit Ourairat, who was a MPs of the party, to become Speaker of the House of Representatives, an important position because of his position as Speaker of the National Assembly which is to lead the list of Prime Minister present to His Majesty and signed in response to the Royal Command appointment of the Prime Minister.

both before and after this election the media went to interview General Suchinda Kraprayoon, who was the commander-in-chief of the Royal Thai Army and the Supreme Commander deputy leader of the National Peace Keeping Council many times whether to be Prime Minister or not which General Suchinda Has clearly refused to accept the position of Prime Minister. this gave Narong Wongwan, the leader of the Justice Unity Party with the highest votes, a chance to become Prime Minister, but it appears that the United States had refused to issue a visa to him due to suspicion that he was involved in a drug trafficking ring, in which case, Narong Wongwan has completely denied this news and that this news is deliberately fabricated to discourage himself becoming prime minister.

The Justice Unity Party won the most seats, 79 seats out of a total of 360 seats, less than half of the House of Representatives  causing the formation of a coalition government with the support from 4 political parties, including 5 coalition parties, namely Justice Unity Party (79), Thai Nation Party (74), Social Action Party (31),  Thai Citizen Party (7), and People Party (4), totaling 195 government MPs.

While the opposition party consists of 6 parties, namely New Aspiration Party (72), Democrat Party (44), Palang Dharma Party (41), Solidarity Party (6), Thai People's Party (1) and Mass Party (1) in total of 165 MPs for the opposition party.

Later, General Suchinda Kraprayoon, Commander-in-Chief of the Royal Thai Army and Supreme Commander was invited as prime minister instead of Narong Wongwan by royal command appointed on Monday, April 7, 1992, but announced his resignation on Saturday, May 24, 1992 after the Black May incident, holding office for only 47 days.

Aftermath 
After the Black May incident, many parties speculated that Air Chief Marshal Somboon Rahong, leader of the Thai Nation Party, Which is the political party with the second most MPs will become the new Prime Minister, but eventually, Dr. Arthit Ourairat, who is the Speaker of the National Assembly has nominated the previous Prime Minister, Anand Panyarachun, return to the position of Prime Minister for a second term to prepare for a new election with a royal command  appointed on Tuesday 10 June 1992.

As for the Justice Unity Party, after the new prime minister, Narong Wongwan, the party's leader resigned, causing the party's executive committee to vacate the entire board. Most of the former party executive committees have decided to resign from party membership to form a new political party or move to other political parties. The remaining ex-executive committee members, including Narong, held a general meeting to change the party's name to Liberal Party and elect a new party executive committee in July 1992, but shortly thereafter. during August all party executive committees decided to resign from party membership. Before Supreme Court an order to dissolve the party later.

References

Biography 

Thailand
General
1992 03